Salmon Lake is located west of Brandreth, New York. The outlet of the lake flows through an unnamed creek into Trout Pond. Fish species present in the lake are brook trout, brown trout, sunfish, black bullhead, yellow perch, and lake trout. Access by hiking a trail from Trout Pond off Stillwater Reservoir. No motors are allowed on Salmon Lake.

References 

Lakes of Herkimer County, New York